The Municipal Borough of Wallingford was an administrative district based on the town of Wallingford, historically in Berkshire, now in administrative Oxfordshire, in southern England. Established in 1834 and disbanded in 1974, when it became part of South Oxfordshire. The municipal borough, administered by Wallingford Borough Council, was based on the ancient borough of Wallingford, which itself was centred on Wallingford’s burh. Wallingford was established as a borough by the time of the Domesday book. Municipal records begin with burghmote rolls in 1232 and gild records in 1227, and the first mayor is recorded for 1231.  The borough was given parliamentary representation as a parliamentary borough in 1295, which continued until 1885. The Mayor of Wallingford remains a title associated with Wallingford Town Council.

References

External links
Wallingford History Gateway

Districts of England abolished by the Local Government Act 1972
Municipal boroughs of England
Wallingford, Oxfordshire
Former districts of Berkshire